The 2000–01 Allsvenskan season was the second season of the Allsvenskan, the second level of ice hockey in Sweden. 23 teams participated in the league, and Södertälje SK, Linköpings HC, Hammarby IF, and IK Okarshamn qualified for the Kvalserien.

Regular season

Northern Group

Southern Group

SuperAllsvenskan

Qualification round

Northern Group

Southern Group

Playoffs

First round 
 Bodens IK - Nyköpings Hockey 90 2:1 (1:0, 1:2, 3:2 OT)
 Mora IK - Tingsryds AIF 2:1 (2:1, 2:5, 5:0)
 IF Troja-Ljungby - Hammarby IF 0:2 (2:3, 3:7)
 IK Oskarshamn - Skellefteå AIK 2:0 (4:0, 5:2)

Second round 
 Mora IK - Hammarby IF 1:2 (4:5, 3:2, 0:4)
 Bodens IK - IK Oskarshamn 1:2 (3:5, 3:2 SO, 2:5)

Relegation round

Northern Group

Southern Group

Kvalserien

External links 
 Season on passionhockey.com

Swe
HockeyAllsvenskan seasons
2